Collegiate School is a preparatory school for boys and girls located in Richmond, Virginia. The student body of Collegiate comprises about 1,600 total students from Junior Kindergarten through 12th Grade. The Lower School and Upper School are coeducational and the Middle School is coordinated with boys and girls in separate classes.

History 
Collegiate was founded in 1915, By Helen Baker as the Collegiate School for Girls, a college preparatory school located in downtown Richmond. In addition to this campus in town, Collegiate opened the Collegiate Country Day School, off Mooreland and River Roads, in 1953 Collegiate's Town School and the Country Day School merged on Mooreland Road in 1960. Collegiate had already developed 60 of these acres for athletic purposes.

Notable alumni 
 Ann Cottrell Free (1934), journalist and author
 Eugene Welch Hickok (1968), former U.S. Deputy Secretary of Education
 Ray Easterling (1968), former safety for Atlanta Falcons
 Stanley Druckenmiller (1971), investment manager
 Steve Kelley (1977), syndicated cartoonist
 Robert Wrenn (1977), professional golfer
Eric Cantor (1981), House Majority Leader (2011-2014), Member of the United States House of Representatives from Virginia's  district (2001-2014)
 David Allen Schools (1983), Widespread Panic bassist
 Mike Henry (1984), actor, producer, and screenwriter for "Family Guy", voice of Cleveland Brown, Herbert, Consuela, Bruce and various other characters
 Robert Ukrop (1988), former professional soccer player for the Davidson Wildcats, Richmond Kickers, and New England Revolution
 Scottie Thompson (2000), actress (NCIS, Trauma)
Bret Myers (2002), soccer player and professor
 Russell Wilson (2007), quarterback for the Denver Broncos, Super Bowl XLVIII champion, businessman, and co-owner of the Seattle Sounders FC
 Wilton Speight (2014), starting quarterback at University of California, Los Angeles (2018) and University of Michigan (2016-2017)

External links

Footnotes 

Educational institutions established in 1915
High schools in Richmond, Virginia
Private K-12 schools in Virginia
1915 establishments in Virginia
Schools in Richmond, Virginia